Mid Michigan College (Mid) is a public community college with two locations in Michigan, one in Harrison and one in Mount Pleasant. Founded in 1965, the college offers one- and two-year certificates and associate degrees in occupational and health science programs.

In 2021 the entire territory of Mount Pleasant Public Schools joined the service area and the taxation area of Mid Michigan College as per the results of an election. 1,593 and 1,415 voters respectively approved being a part of the service area and taxation area while 952 and 1,141 respectively voted against each.

Athletics 
Mid currently fields six varsity teams in the following sports: men's basketball, women's basketball, men's and women's bowling, baseball, and softball.

References

External links 
 

Two-year colleges in the United States
Community colleges in Michigan
Education in Clare County, Michigan
Education in Isabella County, Michigan
Buildings and structures in Clare County, Michigan
Buildings and structures in Isabella County, Michigan
Educational institutions established in 1965
1965 establishments in Michigan